Góngora is a Spanish surname of Navarran origin. People bearing the surname include:

 Alonso de Góngora Marmolejo (1523–1575), Spanish conquistador and chronicler in Chile
 Canek Vázquez Góngora (born 1979), Mexican politician
 Carlos Góngora (born 1989), Ecuadorian amateur boxer
 Efraín Aguilar Góngora (born 1964), Mexican politician
 Genaro David Góngora (born 1937), Mexican jurist and member of Mexico's Supreme Court of Justice
 Jorge Góngora (1906–1999), Peruvian footballer
 Julián Angulo Góngora (born 1953), Mexican lawyer and politician
 Luis de Góngora (1561–1627), Spanish lyric poet of the Siglo de Oro
 Mario Góngora (1915–1985), Chilean historian
 Martín Góngora (born 1980), Uruguayan footballer
 Michael Góngora (born 1970), American politician
 Sandra Góngora (born 1985), Mexican ten-pin bowler

Matronyms
 Margarita Penón Góngora (born 1948), Costa Rican politician
 Antonio Caballero y Góngora (1723-1796), Catholic prelate
 Fausto Cruzat y Góngora, governor-general of the Philippines
 Gervasio Cruzat y Góngora, governor of Nuevo Mexico
 Pedro Francisco de Luján y Góngora, 1st Duke of Almodóvar del Río (1727-1794)

See also
Gongora, orchid named after Antonio Caballero y Góngora

Basque-language surnames